Love and Liquor is a 1920 Burmese black & white silent film directed by Ohn Maung, written by P Moe Nin and starring Nyi Pu. It was the first Burmese feature film, and the day it premiered, 13 October 1920, is commemorated annually as Myanmar Movie Day.

Plot
Love and Liquor is the story about how gambling and alcohol destroyed a man's life.

Cast
Nyi Pu
Aye Kyi
Maung Maung Chit
Maung Maung Kalay
Pu
Ko Nyein
Par Gyi
Ba Ga Lay or Shwe Yoe

Production and release
Ohn Maung, Burma's pioneer filmmaker, had founded the Burma Film Company. He hired Nyi Pu, Burma's first actor, to act in the first Burmese feature film, the silent Myitta Nit Thuya (Love and Liquor).

The film opened with the title "Burma Film Presents: Love and Liquor" but there were no credits or mention of the cast. It was based on a story by P Moe Nin.

Love and Liquor premiered at the Royal Cinema in Yangon on 13 October 1920, a day since commemorated as Myanmar Movie Day.

The film proved a major success, despite its poor quality due to a fixed camera position and inadequate film accessories.

See also
Mya Nat Maung, first Burmese audio film.

References

1920 films
Silent films
Burmese black-and-white films
1920 drama films
Burmese silent films